Amy Laufer was the 2019 Democratic nominee in an unsuccessful bid for Virginia's 17th Senate district, which stretches from Fredericksburg to the suburbs of Charlottesville in Albemarle County, and includes all of Orange County and parts of Culpepper County, Louisa County and Spotsylvania County. She lost in the general election to Republican incumbent Bryce Reeves, 51.6 percent to 48.1 percent.

Early life
Laufer grew up on a dairy farm in rural Wisconsin, one of eight children and the first in her family to attend college, working her way through the University of Wisconsin-Milwaukee and earning a bachelor's degree in geology. She then joined the Peace Corps, teaching elementary school in a rural town in Jamaica. Following the Peace Corps, she attended Teachers College at Columbia University in New York City, graduating with a master's degree in secondary science education.

Career
Laufer is a former school teacher, having taught at Louisa County Middle School and Tandem Friends School in Charlottesville. In 2011, she was elected to the Charlottesville School Board, and served as the board's vice chair and chair from 2012 to 2016.

In 2014, she founded Virginia's List, a political group supporting Democratic women running for office.

Campaign for Senate
Laufer's primary opponent was Ben Hixon, former chairman of the Democratic Party of Culpeper, whom she defeated June 11, 2019 by a margin of 78.6 percent to 21.4 percent. She faces Republican incumbent Bryce Reeves in November 2019.

Personal and family
Laufer lives in Albemarle County with her husband Aaron and their three children.

References

External links
 Official campaign website
 VoteSmart.org, Amy Laufer

21st-century American politicians
Living people
Virginia Democrats
Year of birth missing (living people)